The initials LTF may stand for:

 Lateral tegmental field
 Lactoferrin
 Lyon Turin Ferroviaire